Flat-Out Jump Suite is an album by jazz saxophonist Julius Hemphill recorded in 1980 for the Italian Black Saint label.

Reception
The Penguin Guide to Jazz selected this album as part of its suggested Core Collection.

The Allmusic review by Brian Olewnick awarded the album 3 stars calling it "a solid set from a quartet of fine musicians".

Track listing
All compositions by Julius Hemphill
 "Ear" - 8:54 
 "Mind (1st Part)" - 12:25 
 "Mind (2nd Part)" - 3:17 
 "Heart" - 9:50 
 "Body" - 6:58 
Recorded at Barigozzi Studio in Milano, Italy on June 4 & 5, 1980

Personnel
Julius Hemphill - flute, tenor saxophone
Olu Dara - trumpet
Abdul Wadud - cello
Warren Smith - percussion

References 

Black Saint/Soul Note albums
Julius Hemphill albums
1980 albums